149 members were elected to local boards in the 2013 Auckland local board elections, an election held as part of the 2013 New Zealand local elections.

Local Board elections
This table shows a summary of the results (excluding Whau):

Rodney Local Board

Wellsford Subdivision (1)

Warkworth Subdivision (3)

Kumeu Subdivision (4)

Dairy Flat Subdivision (1)

Hibiscus and Bays Local Board

Hibiscus Coast Subdivision (4)

East Coast Bays Subdivision (4)

Upper Harbour Local Board (6)

Devonport-Takapuna Local Board (6)

Henderson-Massey Local Board (8)

Waitākere Ranges Local Board (6)

Albert-Eden Local Board

Maungawhau Subdivision (4)

Owairaka Subdivision (4)

Great Barrier Local Board (5)

Waiheke Local Board (5)

Puketapapa Local Board (6)

Ōrākei Local Board (7)

Maungakiekie-Tamaki Local Board

Tamaki Subdivision Local Board (4)

Maungakiekie Subdivision Local Board (3)

Howick Local Board

Botany Subdivision Local Board (3)

Howick Subdivision Local Board (3)

Pakuranga Subdivision Local Board (3)

Kaipātiki Local Board (8)

Mangere-Otahuhu Local Board (7)

Otara-Papatoetoe Local Board

Papatoetoe Subdivision Local Board (4)

Otara Subdivision Local Board (3)

Franklin Local Board

Waiuku Subdivision of the Franklin Local Board (2)

Pukekohe Subdivision of the Franklin Local Board (4)

Wairoa Subdivision of the Franklin Local Board (3)

Manurewa Local Board (8)

Papakura Local Board (8)

See also
2013 New Zealand local elections
2013 Auckland local elections

References

Auckland
Auckland
Local elections 2013
2010s in Auckland